Dileep (born 1968) is an Indian film actor and producer who works in Malayalam films.

Dileep may also refer to:

 Dileep Agrawal, (born 1973), Nepalese businessman, entrepreneur, philanthropist and investor
Dileep G. Bal, (born 1945), Indian-American physician
 Dileep Singh Bhuria, (1944–2015) was a member of Lok Sabha of India
 Dileep George, (born 1977), AI and neuroscience researcher
 Dileep Jhaveri (born 1943), Gujarati language poet, playwright, editor and translator from India
 Dileep Kumar (politician), Indian politician and Member of Andhra Pradesh Legislative Council
 Dileep K. Nair, Indian educationist, skill development campaigner, social activist and publisher
 Dileep Nair, former United Nations Under Secretary General
 Dileep Rao (born 1973), American actor
 Dileep Raj (born 1978), Indian actor, director and producer known for his work in Kannada cinema
 Dileepbhai Sanghani (born 1954), politician
 Dileep Singh (1891–1961), the last official ruler of the princely state of Sailana State
 A. R. Rahman (born Dileep Kumar in 1966), Indian composer, musician, and record producer

See also
 Dilip (disambiguation)